Madhuvanthi Arun is an Indian actress. She is the daughter of actor Y. G. Mahendran.
 She is a choreographer, and at times a director of various theater productions. She is currently a State executive committee member of the Tamil Nadu Bharatiya Janata Party (BJP).

Personal life
She was born to a Brahmin family. She is the daughter of popular actor and playwright Y. G. Mahendra and granddaughter of veteran playwright Y. G. Parthasarathy and educationist Rajalakshmi Parthasarathy. Filmmaker K. Balaji, actress Vyjayanthimala and Latha Rajinikanth are her relatives. In 2016, she made her debut in the Tamil film industry as an actress. She was married to V. Arunkumar, grandson of Gemini Ganesan and Savitri but now divorced.

She is on the board of trustees of the Calibre Educational Foundation. In January 2009, she was one of fifteen women named “Women of the Year” in The Ritz Fashion Magazine.

Madhuvanthi took a loan of 1 crore Rs in 2016 to buy her house at Hinduja Leyland Finance. She allegedly failed to pay Rs 1.21 lakh  along with interest on the loan. Subsequently, the Metropolitan court ordered sealing of Madhuvanthi's house in a case filed by the financial institution. Accordingly, the financial institution officials, who accompanied Thenampet police to Madhuvanthi's house sealed her on house October 13, 2021.

Politics 
Madhuvanthi was appointed as State executive committee member of the Tamil Nadu BJP on July 3, 2020.

Political views 
Madhuvanthi wants Tamil people to learn Hindi, she said "If a person wanted to get Pani poori from a vendor, one has to know Hindi to ask them and therefore hindi is very necessary".  Madhuvanthi on 2019 said that she was proud to be born a Brahmin. She said that most people don't do their jobs based on their varna in the present time, even if people don't do the job of the varna that does not mean they don't belong in the varna, everyone must do their varna's job because that is their Karma". She also said that other caste people must be proud of their caste like she is proud of her Brahmin caste. In an interview in 2019, she claimed that Brahmins have higher brain power.

Controversies 
Madhuvanthi faced online backlash on April 5, 2020, when she claimed that turning all lights off for 9 minutes on 9 pm will kill all instances of the coronavirus with double-power during Modi's "nine-minutes lighting ceremony". Many people asked to government to take action against her for spreading misinformation.

Madhuvanthi received backlash and criticism, when she spoke in an interview that she is proud of her caste in August 2019.

Filmography

Television

References

Women educators from Tamil Nadu
Educators from Tamil Nadu
Living people
Indian film actresses
Actresses in Tamil cinema
1977 births